The Einstein Papers Project (EPP) produces the historical edition of the writings and correspondence of Albert Einstein. The EPP collects, transcribes, translates, annotates, and publishes materials from Einstein's literary estate and a multitude of other repositories, which hold Einstein-related historical sources. The staff of the project is an international collaborative group of scholars, editors, researchers, and administrators working on the ongoing authoritative edition, The Collected Papers of Albert Einstein (CPAE).

The EPP was established by Princeton University Press (PUP) in 1977 at the Institute for Advanced Study. The founding editor of the project was professor of physics John Stachel. In 1984, the project moved from Princeton to Stachel's home institution, Boston University. The first volume of the CPAE was published by PUP in 1987. The following year, historian of science Martin J. Klein of Yale University was appointed senior editor of the project. Volumes 1-6 and 8 of the series were completed during the project's time in Boston.

In 2000, professor of history Diana Kormos-Buchwald was appointed general editor and director of the EPP and established offices for the project at the California Institute of Technology (Caltech) In Pasadena, California. Volumes 7 and 9-16 of the CPAE have been completed since the project's move to Caltech. (Volume 11 in the series is a comprehensive index and bibliography to Volumes 1-10).

The CPAE volumes include Einstein's books, his published and unpublished scientific and non-scientific articles, his lecture and research notebooks, travel diaries, book reviews, appeals, and reliable records of his lectures, speeches, interviews with the press, and other oral statements. The volumes also include his professional, personal, and political correspondence. Each annotated volume, referred to as the documentary edition, presents full text documents in their original language, primarily German. Introductions, endnotes, texts selected for inclusion as abstracts, etc. are in English. Volume 16 of the CPAE is the most recent publication in the series; the first sixteen volumes cover Einstein's life up to May 1929. PUP publishes the series. With each documentary edition, the EPP simultaneously publishes a companion English translation volume.

The EPP collaborates with the Albert Einstein Archives at the Hebrew University of Jerusalem. In his last will and testament, Einstein bequeathed his literary estate and his personal papers to the Hebrew University. The project and the archives maintain and update a shared archival database of 90,000+ records, freely accessible online. Support for the project comes from PUP, endowments from individuals and universities, the National Science Foundation, and the National Endowment for the Humanities.

In late 2014, the EPP and PUP launched The Digital Einstein Papers. The website presents the complete contents of The Collected Papers of Albert Einstein, Volumes 1-15. The project volumes are reproduced online as fully searchable PDFs. All documents and endnotes are linked to provide seamless transitions between the original language documentary edition and English translations. Subsequent volumes will be added to the website approximately eighteen months after their release in print. It is projected that there will be thirty volumes in the series. Eventually, the Digital Einstein Papers website will provide access to all of Einstein's writings and correspondence accompanied by scholarly annotation and apparatus.

 The Early Years: 1879-1902  is the first volume in the series.
 The Swiss Years: 1900-1914   and The Berlin Years: 1914-1929   followed through volume 16 in two parallel and extensively cross-referenced branches:
Writings:   published and previously unpublished articles, lecture notes, research notes, accounts of his lectures, speeches, interviews, book reviews, etc.
 Correspondence:   letters, travel diaries, calendars, documents about Einstein by third parties, etc.

The early years: 1879-1902

Volume 1 - Collected Papers 1879-1902
Includes many previously unpublished documents, e.g. class notes for Heinrich Friedrich Weber's lectures on thermodynamics and electromagnetism during Einstein's second year at ETH Zurich,  etc.
 The Collected Papers of Albert Einstein, Volume 1, The Early Years: 1879-1902. 
Editors:  John Stachel et al.    , 1987.

The Swiss years: 1900-1914

Volume 2 - Writings 1900-1909
Includes Einstein's first (1900) published paper after his graduation from ETH Zurich,  the Annus Mirabilis Papers,  text of his invited lecture after his first academic appointment to the University of Zurich, etc.
 The Collected Papers of Albert Einstein, Volume 2, The Swiss Years: Writings, 1900-1909. 
 Editors: John Stachel et al.    , 1989.

Volume 3 - Writings 1909-1911
Includes Einstein's report to the first Solvay Conference,  his appointment to the Charles University in Prague,  his paper calculating gravitational bending of light,  previously unpublished lecture notes,  etc.
 The Collected Papers of Albert Einstein, Volume 3, The Swiss Years: Writings, 1909-1911. 
 Editors: Martin J. Klein et al.    , 1993.

Volume 4 - Writings 1912-1914
Includes a previously unpublished manuscript on relativity and electrodynamics,  a notebook documenting his preparation for his first joint paper (1913, with Marcel Grossmann),  previously unknown calculations with Michele Besso on the motion of the perihelion of Mercury,  etc.
 The Collected Papers of Albert Einstein, Volume 4, The Swiss Years: Writings, 1912-1914. 
 Editors: Martin J. Klein et al.    , 1995.

Volume 5 - Correspondence 1902-1914
Includes more than five hundred previously unpublished letters to and from Einstein in his early adulthood, from his first employment at the Swiss patent office in 1902 through his appointment to the Prussian Academy of Sciences in 1914.  Correspondents included Max von Laue, Paul Ehrenfest, Alfred Kleiner, Fritz Haber, Walther Nernst,  etc.
 The Collected Papers of Albert Einstein, Volume 5, The Swiss Years: Correspondence, 1902-1914. 
 Editors: Martin J. Klein et al.    , 1993.

The Berlin years: 1914-1929

Volume 6 - Writings 1914-1917
Includes papers describing Einstein's only experimental physics investigation, a study of André-Marie Ampère's molecular current theory of electromagnetism with Wander Johannes de Haas; etc.
 The Collected Papers of Albert Einstein, Volume 6, The Berlin Years: Writings, 1914-1917. 
 Editors: A. J. Kox et al.    , 1996.

Volume 7 - Writings 1918-1921
 The Collected Papers of Albert Einstein, Volume 7, The Berlin Years: Writings, 1918-1921. 
 Editors: Michel Janssen et al.    , 2002.

Volume 8 - Correspondence 1914-1918
 The Collected Papers of Albert Einstein, Volume 8, The Berlin Years: Correspondence, 1914-1918. 
 Editors: R. Schulmann et al.    In two volumes.  , 1997.

Volume 9 - Correspondence  January 1919-April 1920
 The Collected Papers of Albert Einstein, Volume 9, The Berlin Years: Correspondence, January 1919 - April 1920. 
 Editors: Diana Kormos-Buchwald et al.    , 2004.

Volume 10 - Correspondence May–December 1920,  Supplementary Correspondence 1909-1920
 The Collected Papers of Albert Einstein, Volume 10, The Berlin Years: Correspondence, May–December 1920, and Supplementary Correspondence, 1909-1920. 
 Editors: Diana Kormos-Buchwald et al.    , 2006.

Volume 11 - Cumulative Index, Bibliography, List of Correspondence, Chronology, and Errata to Volumes 1 - 10
 The Collected Papers of Albert Einstein, Volume 11, Cumulative Index, Bibliography, List of Correspondence, Chronology, and Errata to Volumes 1 - 10. 
 Editors: Diana Kormos-Buchwald et al.    , 2009.

Volume 12 - The Berlin Years: Correspondence, January - December 1921
 The Collected Papers of Albert Einstein, Volume 12, The Berlin Years: Correspondence, January - December 1921. 
 Editors: Diana Kormos-Buchwald et al.    , 2009.

Volume 13 - The Berlin Years: Writings & Correspondence, January 1922 - March 1923
 The Collected Papers of Albert Einstein, Volume 13, The Berlin Years: Writings & Correspondence, January 1922 - March 1923. 
Editors: Diana Kormos-Buchwald et al.    , 2012.

Volume 14 - The Berlin Years: Writings & Correspondence, April 1923 - May 1925
 The Collected Papers of Albert Einstein, Volume 14, The Berlin Years: Writings & Correspondence, April 1923 - May 1925. 
 Editors: Diana Kormos-Buchwald et al.   , 2015.

Volume 15 - The Berlin Years: Writings & Correspondence, June 1925 - May 1927 

 The Collected Papers of Albert Einstein, Volume 15, The Berlin Years: Writings & Correspondence, June 1925 - May 1927.
 Editors: Diana Kormos-Buchwald et al.  , 2018.

Volume 16 - The Berlin Years: Writings & Correspondence, June 1927 - May 1929 

 The Collected Papers of Albert Einstein, Volume 16, The Berlin Years: Writings & Correspondence, June 1927 - May 1929.
 Editors: Diana Kormos-Buchwald et al.  , 2021.

The Digital Einstein Papers
The Digital Einstein Papers is an open-access site for The Collected Papers of Albert Einstein. The site presents volumes 1–16 and will add subsequent volumes in the series roughly two years after original book publication. The volumes are presented in the original language version with in-depth English language annotation and other scholarly apparatus. In addition, the reader can toggle to an English language translation of most documents. By clicking on the unique archival identifier number below each text, readers can access the archival record of each published document at the Einstein Archives Online and in some cases, the digitized manuscript. The launch of The Digital Einstein Papers has attracted broad attention in the press so far, with coverage ranging from The New York Times to The Wall Street Journal.

Trustees
The trustees of Einstein's literary estate were:
 Otto Nathan: executor and co-trustee,  professor of economics, author and friend.
 Helen Dukas: co-trustee,  Einstein's secretary for nearly thirty years.

Editors 
The editors of The Collected Papers of Albert Einstein were:

 John Stachel: First editor, volumes 1, 2
 Martin J. Klein: Editor, volumes 3, 4, 5, 6
 Robert Schulmann: Editor, volumes 3, 4, 5, 6, 7, 8, 9; associate editor, volumes 1, 2
 A. J. Kox: Editor, volumes 3, 4, 5, 6, 8, 11, 15, 16; associate editor, volumes 7, 9, 10, 12, 13, 14
 Tilman Sauer: Editor, volumes 9, 10, 11, 12, 13, 14, 16; contributing editor, volume 4
 Jürgen Renn: Editor, volumes 3, 4; assistant editor, volumes 1, 2
 Michel Janssen: Editor, volumes 7, 8
 Christoph Lehner: Editor, volume 7
 Virginia Iris Holmes: Editor, volumes 10, 12
 Osik Moses: Editor, volumes 11, 14; associate editor, volumes 12, 13
 Dennis Lehmkuhl: Editor, volumes 15, 16; associate editor, volumes 13, 14
 Issachar Unna, associate editor, volumes 13, 14, 15
 József Illy: Editor, volumes 7, 8, 9, 10, 12, 13, 14, 15, 16; contributing editor, volumes 4, 6
 Daniel J. Kennefick: Editor, volumes 9, 16; associate editor, volumes 7, 10, 12, 13, 15

Current editors of The Collected Papers of Albert Einstein are:

 Diana Kormos-Buchwald: director and general editor, Robert M. Abbey Professor of History at Caltech. A historian of modern physical science.
 Ze'ev Rosenkranz: senior editor and assistant director, past curator of the Albert Einstein Archives, Jerusalem.
 Emily de Araújo: assistant editor and public relations administrator.
 Rudy Hirschmann: IT manager.
 Jennifer Nollar James: associate editor.

Executive committee 
The current executive committee members of the project are:

Yemima Ben Menahem: Professor, Department of Philosophy (The Hebrew University of Jerusalem)
 Michael Gordin: Rosengarten Professor of Modern and Contemporary History and Director, Society of Fellows in the Liberal Arts (Princeton University)
 John L. Heilbron: Visiting Associate in History, Division of the Humanities and Social Sciences (California Institute of Technology)
 Daniel J. Kevles: Professor Emeritus, Department of History (Yale University)
 John D. Norton: Professor, Department of History and Philosophy of Science (University of Pittsburgh)
 Barbara Oberg: Professor, Department of History (Princeton University)
 Moshe Sluhovsky: Professor and Chair, Department of History, Vigevani Chair in European Studies (The Hebrew University of Jerusalem)
 Joseph H. Taylor: Professor Emeritus, Department of Physics (Princeton University)
 Kip S. Thorne: Professor Emeritus, Division of Physics, Mathematics and Astronomy (California Institute of Technology)
 Sean Wilentz: Professor, Department of History (Princeton University)

See also
 Albert Einstein Archives
List of scientific publications by Albert Einstein
Princeton University Press
California Institute of Technology

References

External links 
 The Einstein Papers Project at the California Institute of Technology.
 Digital Einstein Papers at Princeton University.
 The Emergency Committee of Atomic Scientists in Post-War America (Project of the Oregon State University)
 
 
         
Hirschmann, Rudolf (September 2011) "After the Prize: Indexing at the Einstein Papers Project". The Indexer, Volume 29, No. 3. 
Dietrich, Jane S. (2000) "Einstein Redux". Engineering and Science, No. 3. California Institute of Technology, Pasadena, CA.

1986 establishments in California
Organizations established in 1986
Albert Einstein
History of physics
Organizations based in Pasadena, California